William McClelland (March 2, 1842 – February 7, 1892) was a Democratic member of the U.S. House of Representatives from Pennsylvania.

William McClelland was born in Mount Jackson, Pennsylvania.  He attended Westminster College in New Wilmington, Pennsylvania.  He served in the American Civil War for four years, mustering out as captain in Battery B, 1st Pennsylvania Light Artillery.  He attended Allegheny College, studied law, was admitted to the bar and commenced practice at Mount Jackson in 1870.

McClelland was elected as a Democrat to the Forty-second Congress.  He was an unsuccessful candidate for reelection in 1872.  He resumed the practice of his profession, and in January 1891 he was appointed adjutant general of the Pennsylvania National Guard, and he served in this position until his death.

McClelland died in Harrisburg, Pennsylvania, on March 2, 1892.  Interment in Allegheny Cemetery in Pittsburgh, Pennsylvania.

Sources

The Political Graveyard

External links

1842 births
1892 deaths
Westminster College (Pennsylvania) alumni
Allegheny College alumni
Pennsylvania lawyers
Politicians from Harrisburg, Pennsylvania
People from Lawrence County, Pennsylvania
People of Pennsylvania in the American Civil War
Democratic Party members of the United States House of Representatives from Pennsylvania
Burials at Allegheny Cemetery
19th-century American politicians
19th-century American lawyers